Charmont Apartments is an historic five-story apartment building in Santa Monica, California which was built in 1928.  Designed by architect Max Maltzman with elements of both the Mission Revival-Spanish Colonial Revival style and the Art Deco style, the Charmont was a luxurious high-rise when it was built.  The blending of Spanish Colonial Revival and Art Deco elements was popular style in the 1920s and is sometimes known as "Med-Deco."  The main entrance is located in a walled courtyard that features a two-tiered fountain with an intricate Moorish-patterned backsplash in polychrome tile.  

The Charmont combines Spanish Colonial Revival and Art Deco/Moderne architecture. The  Moderne elements include stylized geometric motifs and extensive use of chevron motifs. Spanish Colonial elements include the courtyard plan, massing, smooth stucco walls, clay tile roofs, and fountain.

The building was damaged in the 1994 Northridge earthquake and subsequently rehabilitated and listed on the National Register of Historic Places.

See also
List of Registered Historic Places in Los Angeles County, California

References

Residential buildings on the National Register of Historic Places in California
Buildings and structures in Santa Monica, California
Art Deco architecture in California
Spanish Colonial Revival architecture in California
Landmarks in Santa Monica, California
Buildings and structures on the National Register of Historic Places in Los Angeles County, California